Black Celebration Tour was a 1986 concert tour by English electronic group Depeche Mode in support of the act's fifth studio album, Black Celebration, which was released in March 1986.

The tour began with a European leg, starting in Oxford, England in late March and finishing in Rüsselsheim, West Germany in late May. A North American jaunt followed in early June, commencing in Boston and culminating mid-July in Irvine, California. Shortly after the North American leg, the group headed to Japan to play three dates.

In early August, the group began a second run of European shows, starting in Fréjus, France. The group performed four additional dates in France, as well as two shows in Italy, before wrapping up the tour in Copenhagen.

Book of Love joined the tour as the opening act on 29 April in Hanover, West Germany, and continuing for the rest of the first European leg and throughout all tour dates of the North American leg (ending on 15 July).

Setlist

"Christmas Island" (Intro tape)
"Black Celebration"
"A Question of Time"
"Fly on the Windscreen"
"Shake the Disease"
"Leave in Silence"
"It's Called a Heart"
"Everything Counts"
 Song performed by Martin Gore
"It Doesn't Matter Two"
"Somebody" (only known performance: 16 August 1986 Copenhagen)
 Song performed by Martin Gore
"A Question of Lust"
"Here Is the House" (only played 29 & 31 March 1986) 
"Blasphemous Rumours" 
"New Dress"
"Stripped"
"Something to Do"
"Master and Servant"
"Photographic"
"People Are People"
 encore 1
"Boys Say Go!"
"Just Can't Get Enough"
 encore 2
"More Than a Party"

Tour dates

Musicians
 Dave Gahan – lead vocals
 Martin Gore – synthesizers, keyboards, melodica, metal pipes, lead and backing vocals
 Alan Wilder – synthesizers, keyboards, metal pipes, backing vocals
 Andrew Fletcher – synthesizers, keyboards, samplers, percussion pads, backing vocals

Support acts 

 Hula
 The Fountainhead
 Book of Love
 The Blah Brothers
 Eyeless in Gaza
 New Order
 Public Panic
 Talk Talk

References

External links
 Official site

Depeche Mode concert tours
1986 concert tours